Celio Technology Corporation was a smartphone terminal manufacturer headquartered in Salt Lake City, UT and responsible for the Redfly product line 
The company's dissolution date was March 1, 2011.

References 

Smartphones